Bedford Hills may refer to the following places in the United States:

 Bedford Hills, New York
 Bedford Hills (Metro-North station) in Bedford Hills, New York
 Bedford Hills Correctional Facility for Women, a prison for women in Bedford Hills, New York
 Bedford Hills, Virginia